El Maitén Airport  is a public use airport located near El Maitén, Chubut, Argentina.

See also
List of airports in Argentina

References

External links 
 Airport record for El Maitén Airport at Landings.com

Airports in Argentina
Chubut Province